The number rose from seven to ten in 2016 after the addition of 2 districts in Baltistan Valley and the bifurcation of the Hunza-Nagar district. , there are 14 districts in Gilgit Baltistan, 5 in the Baltistan Division, 5 in the  Gilgit Division and 4 in the Diamer Division.  

The number rose from seven to ten in 2016 after the addition of 2 districts in Baltistan Valley and the bifurcation of the Hunza-Nagar district.

In 2019, Darel, Tangir, Gupis–Yasin and Roundu were announced as new districts. 

Each district is further divided into tehsils and union councils.

Districts of Gilgit Baltistan

See also
 List of tehsils of Gilgit-Baltistan

References

 
Gilgit-Baltistan